Bloomeria humilis is a rare species of flowering plant that is known by the common name dwarf goldenstar. It is endemic to San Luis Obispo County, California, where it is known from only one occurrence on the coastline near San Simeon.

Description
It is a plant of the local chaparral and coastal grassland. It is a perennial herb growing from a corm and producing one or two narrow leaves up to 10 centimeters long. The inflorescence is up to 8 or 10 centimeters tall and bears several flowers, each on a pedicel. The flower has six brown-stippled yellow tepals each up to a centimeter long. The fruit is a capsule about half a centimeter in length.

References

External links
Jepson Manual Treatment
USDA Plants Profile
Flora of North America
Photo gallery

humilis
Endemic flora of California
Natural history of the California chaparral and woodlands
Natural history of San Luis Obispo County, California
Flora without expected TNC conservation status